India is a country in Southern Asia. It is a federation made up of 28 states and 8 union territories. The foundation day is celebrated to mark the formation of a state/union territory. Some of these states and union territories observe their foundation day as the official state holiday.

State functions, parades, cultural events and also state award ceremonies are held in various states and union territories on their respective foundation day. A state's foundation day, usually but not always falls on their statehood day.

States

Union territories

Autonomous administrative divisions

See also
 Independence Day of India
 Republic Day of India
 List of Indian state symbols
 List of Indian state flags
 List of Indian state emblems
 List of Indian state mottos
 List of Indian state songs
 List of Indian state animals
 List of Indian state birds
 List of Indian state flowers
 List of Indian state trees

References

 
State foundation days
Foundation days